Solamente vos (Spanish for: Only you) is a 2013 Argentine Romantic comedy starring Adrián Suar and Natalia Oreiro, produced by Pol-ka that began to be aired on January 21, 2013 and ended January 20, 2014 from Monday to Thursday at 9:30 pm on the screen of Canal 13 as of June 28, it also began airing on Fridays at 9:30 pm.

Plot 
The main characters are Juan Cousteau and Aurora Andrés. Juan is a music director of a chamber orchestra, and works at a records label with his best friend Félix Month (both of them members of a glam metal band in their youth). Félix is married to Michelle, owner of the records label, but he cheats her with the hairdresser Aurora Andrés. Juan is married with Ingrid, "la polaca", who asked a temporary separation; Juan left the house and moved to the apartment next to Aurora. The separation of Juan and Ingrid generated several crisis with their 5 children.

Aurora did not trust Félix very much, as he did not initially mention that he was married, delayed in separating from Michelle, and discovered him lying and cheating her at several times. She also had a growing love for Juan. Félix finally separated from Michelle and asked Aurora for marriage. She accepted, but still had doubts about him, and escaped from the wedding. Félix got amnesia in an accident, which was exploited by Michelle to keep him as her husband.

Juan and Aurora began a romance, which was resisted by Juan's family. He tried to rebuild the relation with Ingrid at the request of their daughter Mora, who was about to die at the time; the whole family moved to his apartment. Both Aurora and Ingrid got pregnant of Juan at the same time; Aurora did not mention it when she heard Ingrid say it first. Ingrid was informed afterwards that she was not pregnant, that the laboratory made a mistake, but carried on with the pretense of being pregnant anyway. Still, Aurora dropped her lover Segundo and revealed Juan his fatherhood, who openly cheated Ingrid with her. Ingrid finally left the apartment and returned to the original house, and announced that she lost the pregnancy. The kids moved with her, Juan moved to Aurora's house, and his sister Denise moved to his apartment. Both of them finally moved to a new house in Pilar.

Premise
Solamente vos is a romantic comedy with elements of sitcoms. It features the returns to television of Natalia Oreiro and Adrián Suar. The 2012 telenovelas of Pol-ka had low rating points against the productions of the rival channel Telefe, such as Graduados, La Dueña and Dulce amor. However, Suar pointed that the program was not written with the premise of reverting that tendency, and that he had already begun drafting it with the writers a year before.

Adrián Suar began his career as an actor, but soon changed to producer, and his group Pol-ka produced several telenovelas. He resumed his work as an actor in recent years, in films such as Un novio para mi mujer, Igualita a mí and Dos más dos, and theater plays such as El año que viene en el mismo lugar and La guerra de los Roses. Suar considers that those works have improved his acting performance. Natalia Oreiro modified her visual appearance for the telenovela, as she usually does for each new work: she dyed her hair with black color and sported a long fringe.

Another actor that returned to television was Arturo Puig, who starred the success Grande, pá! in the 1990s. He was initially reluctant to do so, and intended to work just in guest appearances. Adrián Suar convinced him to be a steady part of the cast by pointing that he would play a gay character who had just came out of the closet.

Production
The filming of the telenovela began on December 3, 2012, at the Villa Devoto and Villa Pueyrredón neighbourhoods. The scripts were written by Mario Segade, Lily Ann Martin, Marta Betoldi and Daniel Cúparo, and the directors were Claudio Ferrari and Rodolfo Antúnez. The program includes several guest appearances of musicians or music bands, who make a short clip with one of their songs singing along with the characters. Those clips are used to lower the tone when the plot becomes too dramatic. The first musician who worked in the telenovela with this format was David Bisbal, other musicians that appeared later were Carlos Vives, Alejandro Lerner, Patricia Sosa, Cristian Castro Carlos Alfredo Elías, Los Pimpinela and Agapornis. The final episode included a clip by Coti Soroin who made the open theme of the program. Pablo Codevilla, a former actor who works now as a content manager of El Trece, made a brief cameo as a dentist. His appearance included metafictional references, and a deliberate similarity with a contemporary advertisement. He appeared again at the final episode. Juana Viale, the lead actress of Malparida, stayed for a time as the villain of the telenovela. Diego Ramos, who had worked with Natalia Oreiro in 90-60-90 Modelos and Ricos y Famosos, joined the cast in July. The program included as well an in-universe participation of the characters in the A todo o nada game show, which was also aired by El Trece in 2013. The show host Guido Kaczka appeared in the program, playing himself in the fiction.

Reception
The 2013 prime time of Argentine television was highly disputed by the channels El Trece and Telefe. El Trece aired Solamente Vos and Farsantes, and Telefe aired Los Vecinos en Guerra and Celebrity Splash!, both channels with similar ratings. The weekly series Aliados, first aired on June 26, did not break the tie between the channels. Although it is one of the most watched Argentine productions of 2013, the rating is very low in comparison with productions of previous years. This is caused by a general decline in the rating of public TV channels, as people migrate to private cable channels, or to watch TV in internet. Solamente Vos eventually became the 2013 fiction with the highest rating in Argentina, and had 13 rating points at the ending episode. The character "la polaca", played by the actress Muriel Santa Ana, is highly controversial among the fans of the telenovela. She is a manipulative ex-wife trying to seduce her former husband and rebuild the family. She is not a classic telenovela villain, and many fans that faced a similar situation in real life praise the realism of the character. Other fans follow the regular tradition of supporting the heroes, in this case the couple Juan-Aurora. Santa Ana also provides the character with redeemable aspects.

Awards
 Tato Awards
 Best secondary actress (Muriel Santa Ana)
 Best secondary actor (Juan Minujín)
 Best lead actress in comedy (Natalia Oreiro)
 Best lead actor in comedy (Adrián Suar)
 Best daily comedy
 2013 Martín Fierro Awards
 Best daily telecomedy
 Best daily actor in comedy (Adrián Suar)
 Best actress of daily comedy (Natalia Oreiro)

Nominations
 2013 Martín Fierro Awards
 Best secondary actor (Arturo Puig, Juan Minujín and Lito Cruz)
 Best new actor or actress (Lola Poggio)
 Best scripts
 Best director
 Best opening theme

Cast 
 Adrián Suar as Juan Cousteau
 Natalia Oreiro as Aurora Andrés
 Muriel Santa Ana as Ingrid "La Polaca" Albarracín de Cousteau
 María Eugenia Suárez as Julieta Cousteau Albarracín
 Mariana Espósito as Daniela Cousteau Albarracín
 Ángela Torres as Mora Cousteau Albarracín
 Arturo Puig as Lautaro Cousteau
 Juan Minujín as Félix Month
 Coraje Ábalos as Nacho Molina Montes
 Nicolás Vázquez as Facundo Irazábal
 Diego Ramos as Segundo Benson
 Claudia Fontán as Michelle
 Ana María Picchio as Rosita
 Fabiana García Lago as Dalia
 Benjamín Rojas as Federico
 Gustavo Guillén as Gastón
 Zulma Faiad as Miriam
 Victoria Onetto as Susana
 Luisa Kuliok as Rosario
 Josefina Scaglione as Leila
 Henny Trayles as Sara
 Ricardo Morán as Aníbal
 Ramiro Fumazoni as Iván
 Gimena Accardi as Candela
 Karina Jelinek as Carola
 Gustavo Conti as Gustavo
 Marcelo Tinelli as himself
 Joaquín Flamini as Eugenio Cousteau Albarracín
 Lola Poggio as Lucía "Luli" Cousteau Albarracín
 Alberto Martín as Orlando Andrés
 Marina Bellati as Denise Cousteau
 Peto Menahem as Rogelio Belvedere
 Sebastián Wainraich as Leopoldo Fishman
 Juana Viale as Victoria O'Connor
 Rafael Ferro as Rodrigo Perazzo
 Dan Breitman as Sam Noriega
 Luisa Albinoni as Nelida "Frenchi" Garrido
 Laura Cymer as Sharon
 Marcelo de Bellis as Miguel
 Graciela Tenenbaum as Mirna
 Federico Ottone as Rubio
 Paula Baldini as Nani
 Thiago Batistuta as Sebastián
 Laura Laprida as Florencia
 Ángel Bonanni as Boris
 María Fernanda Callejón as Graciela
 Álvaro Teruel as Lucas
 Macarena Paz as Mauge
 Omar Calicchio as Hugo
 Julieta Cajg as Carolina
 Lucila Viggiano as Delfina
 Andrea Rincón as Dalila
 Paula Kohan as Paula
 Manuel Ramos as Lucas 
 Mariana Richaudeau as Diana
 Germán Tripel as Rolo
 Emiliano Lobo as Julián
 Selva Alemán as Beba
 Miguel Ángel Rodríguez as Coco
 Matías Santoianni as Pato
 Julieta Fazzari as Diana
 Agustina Posse as Pamela
 Matías Apostolo as Sergio
 Gadiel Sztryk as Hans
 Renato Quattordio as Franco
 René Bertrand as Marcelo

References

External links
 Official site 
 
 TV Tropes

2013 telenovelas
Pol-ka telenovelas
Musical television series
Argentine LGBT-related television shows
2013 Argentine television series debuts
2014 Argentine television series endings
Television shows set in Buenos Aires